The bazantar is a  custom made string instrument invented by musician Mark Deutsch, who worked on the design between 1993 and 1997.

Overview
The Bazantar is a six-string acoustic bass, fitted with an additional twenty-nine sympathetic strings and four drone strings. The instrument possesses a melodic range of over five octaves, and its sympathetic range spans four octaves. The inventor intends this to create an interplay between melodic, sympathetic, and drone strings to produce a more resonant sound than a conventional upright bass.

History and development
In the late 1980s, Mark Deutsch began exploring North Indian classical music. The subtlety of this style, combined with his pursuits on the sitar, inspired him to delve deeper into the study of music. He started exploring the mathematics of sound, particularly music's underlying frequency structure. This search revealed nonlinear mathematical patterns that exist in sound and are found universally in the natural world, including the overtone series, fractals, the golden mean, seashells, and the Fibonacci series.

In 1993, Mark began work on the first prototype of the Bazantar, an acoustic bass with additional sympathetic and drone strings. His intent was to create an instrument that would take advantage of these nonlinear mathematical patterns and make them more consciously audible. The difficulty lay in engineering a design that would be able to withstand the tension of the additional strings. He devised the unique solution of constructing a separate housing that would contain both the sympathetic strings and their resultant tension, which would then be mounted onto the instrument. After much experimentation, a finalized version was completed in October 1997.

Final design
In the finalized version, the drone strings are positioned outside the Bazantar's lowest melody string on a bass bridge, which has been modified to support this configuration. The sympathetic strings are held in a modular graphite housing that is positioned between the feet of the main bridge and mounted at the bottom of the tailpiece and at the base of the neck, underneath the fingerboard. The torque these strings create is contained within this housing. Because none of this torque is transferred to the instrument's body, the stress to its structure is greatly decreased, allowing for increased flexibility throughout the entire design. The Bazantar's engineering strategy enables it to maintain more strings at higher tensions than conventional approaches dictate. This distinguishes its tonal character and contributes to its powerful and complex sound.

External links
Mark Deutsch's Bazantar page
Mark Deutsch's Bandcamp page
oddmusic.com Bazantar Information Page with sound samples
The Stringed Instrument Database's section on the Bazantar
YouTube video of Mark Deutsch talking about and playing the Bazantar

References

Double basses
Experimental musical instruments
String instruments with sympathetic strings
1993 musical instruments